The 116th (Perthshire Highlanders) Regiment of Foot was an infantry regiment of the British Army, formed in 1793 and disbanded in 1795, with some personnel sent to the 42nd Highlanders.

References

External links

Infantry regiments of the British Army
Military units and formations established in 1793
Military units and formations disestablished in 1795
1793 establishments in Great Britain
1795 disestablishments in Great Britain
1793 establishments in Scotland
1795 disestablishments in Scotland